Daniel Philliskirk (born 10 April 1991) is an English professional footballer who plays as a forward for  club AFC Fylde.

Born in Oldham, Greater Manchester, he began his career as a junior with Oldham Athletic before moving to Chelsea. Having failed to break into the Chelsea side he spent time on loan at Oxford United before signing for Sheffield United. Having been on the fringes of first team football he was eventually released to allow him to join Coventry City on a short-term contract, before his return to Oldham. In January 2016, he signed for Blackpool on a -year deal with the club having an option to extend a further year.

Philliskirk is the son of former Sheffield United and Bolton Wanderers forward Tony Philliskirk who is the head of youth development at Oldham Athletic.

Career

Early career
Philliskirk began his career with his home town club, Oldham Athletic. He progressed through the club's youth system before signing a four-year contract with Chelsea in the summer of 2007. He captained the Chelsea youth team in the 2008–09 season before establishing himself in the club's reserves.

He signed a one-month loan deal with Oxford United in August 2010, making his first-team début (and only appearance for Oxford) against Burton Albion in the Football League a few days later before returning to Chelsea.

Sheffield United
Philliskirk joined Sheffield United on a month's loan in January 2011, which was then extended until the end of the season. He had to wait until mid-April to make his first appearance for the Blades, away at Preston coming on as a second-half substitute, following which he signed a pre-contract agreement to join the Blades permanently at the end of the season. He was released from Chelsea after finishing his contract with them and later joined Sheffield United, as promised, on a free transfer. In his first full season at Bramall Lane however, he found first-team opportunities limited and agreed to re-join Oxford United on a month's loan in October 2011 making four appearances for the Us.

On his return to Bramall Lane Philliskirk remained on the fringes of the first team and was rewarded with an extended deal in January 2012. The following season, he remained unable to make the break into the first team and was released by United in January 2013.

Coventry City
Philliskirk undertook a trial at Coventry City following his release from Sheffield United. After impressing manager Mark Robins, he signed a contract until June 2013. Steven Pressley, who had replaced Robins as Coventry manager, announced on 30 April 2013 that Philliskirk's contract would not be renewed. In total, Philliskirk made a single appearance for the club.

Following his release from Coventry, Philliskirk trialled in the summer of 2013 with Championship side Doncaster Rovers.

Oldham Athletic
After his release from his contract at Coventry and impressing whilst on trial at the club where his career began, Philliskirk signed a two-year contract with the option of a third on 28 August 2013, becoming Lee Johnson's eleventh summer signing. Philliskirk scored 2 goals on his debut for Latics in a 4–1 away victory against Shrewsbury in the Football League Trophy. Following this up with goals against Preston, also in the Football League Trophy, and his first career league goal a winner against Swindon Town.

On 2 May 2014, Philliskirk signed an extension on his contract for a further two-years with the option of a third year.

Blackpool
On 7 January 2016, Philliskirk joined Blackpool on an initial two-and-a-half year deal from Oldham Athletic for an undisclosed fee. He scored his first goal for the Seasiders in a 5–0 win against Scunthorpe United. He was released by Blackpool at the end of the 2017–18 season.

AFC Fylde
After being released by Blackpool at the end of the 2017–18 season, Philliskirk joined National League club AFC Fylde on a two-year contract. He scored his first Fylde goal in a 1–1 draw away to Barnet on 22 September 2018. Philliskirk then went onto score in Fylde's 3–0 over Braintree Town on 29 September 2018. On 27 October 2018, he scored in a comfortable 6–0 away win against Maidenhead United.

International career
Philliskirk earned three caps for the England U17 team in 2007.

Personal life
Philliskirk is the son of former Sheffield United and Bolton forward Tony Philliskirk and was briefly coached by his father in Oldham Athletic's youth team. Philliskirk is of partial Scottish descent on his father's side.

Career statistics

Honours
AFC Fylde
FA Trophy: 2018–19

References

External links

Danny Philliskirk – Sheffield United profile
Daniel Philliskirk England stats at The Football Association

1991 births
Living people
Footballers from Oldham
English footballers
England youth international footballers
Association football forwards
Oldham Athletic A.F.C. players
Chelsea F.C. players
Oxford United F.C. players
Sheffield United F.C. players
Coventry City F.C. players
Blackpool F.C. players
AFC Fylde players
English Football League players
National League (English football) players
English people of Irish descent
English people of Scottish descent